is a Japanese TV program which began airing on April 4, 2014. This is a variety show which features Weekly Shōnen Jump, V Jump, Jump Square, Saikyō Jump and their anime and games. JUMPolice is short for Jump Under Mission Police.

Characters
Oriental Radio 
Atsuhiko Nakata - He is the boss of the JUMPolice 
Shingo Fujimori - He is his assistant
Rika Adachi - She is checker.
Rina Ikoma - She is the leader of researchers.
Yui Ito - She is researcher.　She tells the next issue of the magazines.
Takashi Kondo and Ryoko Shintani- narrators
Pororisu-kun - He is mascot character voiced by Ryoko Shintani.

JUMPolice investigators
All of them are members of Nogizaka46.
Yumi Wakatsuki
Kazumi Takayama
Sayuri Matsumura
Manatsu Akimoto
Yūri Saitō
Reika Sakurai

Main corner
Kochikame short trip
Masao Inuduka dresses as Kankichi Ryotsu, and travels around Kameari and Ueno, Asakusa and so on. Nataria dresses as Reiko, and Gregory dresses as Nakagawa, Fujimori dresses as Ohara, Tonikaku akarui yasumura dresses as kaipan deka.
Here comes Osamurai-chan!
Osamurai-chan travels around Japan to look for Yu-Gi-Oh! cards.
Informacial
Yui Ito talks about coming issues of the magazines. This corner is a commercial for Shueisha.

References

External links
 

Japanese variety television shows
TV Tokyo original programming
2014 Japanese television series debuts
Japanese children's television series
2019 Japanese television series endings